Carley V. Porter  (February 19, 1906 – December 6, 1972) served in the California State Assembly for the 69th and 38th district from 1951 to his death in 1972. Legislation that bears his name includes the Burns-Porter Act, which resulted in the California State Water Project, and the Porter-Cologne Water Quality Control Act, anti-pollution legislation which predated the federal Clean Water Act. During World War II, Porter served in the United States Army.

References

United States Army personnel of World War II
1906 births
1972 deaths
20th-century American politicians
Republican Party members of the California State Assembly